Zdzisław Dobrucki (26 November 1944 – 21 May 2021) was an international speedway rider from Poland.

Speedway career 
Dobrucki was the Champion of Poland in 1976. He won a bronze medal at the Speedway World Team Cup in the 1972 Speedway World Team Cup.

World final appearances

World Team Cup
 1972 -  Olching, Olching Speedwaybahn (with Zenon Plech / Henryk Glücklich / Marek Cieślak / Paweł Waloszek) - 3rd - 21pts (3)

References 

1944 births
2021 deaths
Polish speedway riders
People from Śrem